Anabella Isabel Hale Ruíz (born January 20, 1983) is a Panamanian model and Panamanian beauty queen. She was elected Miss Panamá international 2004; this gave her the opportunity to compete in the 44th Miss International 2004 pageant which was held at Workers Indoor Arena, Beijing, China on October 16, 2004.

She represented Panama Oeste state.

Pageant participations

Señorita Panamá 2003
In 2003 participate in the Señorita Panamá 2003 where she was unplace, contest winner for Jessica Rodríguez who participated in the Miss Universe 2004 (who in turn failed to enter the semifinals of Miss Universe 2004).

Miss Atlántico Internacional 2004
On January 23, 2004, represent Panamá in the Miss Atlántico Internacional Beauty pageant also won the Best national costume and the little Embajadora Internacional Mon-Por.

References

Living people
Panamanian beauty pageant winners
Señorita Panamá
1983 births
Miss International 2004 delegates